Cheralite is an anhydrous phosphate mineral with the ideal chemical formula CaTh(PO4)2. It is isomorphous with huttonite and monazite. It can be regarded as the product of the complete cationic substitution in the system:

2 LREE3+ ↔ Ca2+ + Th4+.

It was previously known under the name brabantite.

Physical properties:

References 

Thorium minerals
Phosphate minerals